Charles B. King may refer to:
 Charles B. King (soldier) (died 1944), American namesake of Camp King in Germany 
 Charles Bird King (1785–1862), United States portrait painter
 Charles Brady King (1868-1957), American engineer & entrepreneur

See also 
Charles King (disambiguation)
King (surname)